Marion County Bridge 0501F, also known as Indiana State Bridge 534-C-3439 on SR 100, is a historic truss bridge located on the Michigan Road at Indianapolis, Marion County, Indiana.  It was built in 1941–1942, as a bridge along the State Road 100 project.  It consists of two identical Warren pony truss sections at each end with two Parker through truss spans at the center.  The pony truss sections are each 96 feet long and the through truss spans are 174 feet long.

It was added to the National Register of Historic Places in 2006.

References

Road bridges on the National Register of Historic Places in Indiana
Bridges completed in 1942
Buildings and structures in Indianapolis
National Register of Historic Places in Indianapolis
Steel bridges in the United States
Warren truss bridges in the United States
Parker truss bridges in the United States
Transportation buildings and structures in Marion County, Indiana
1942 establishments in Indiana